Business Executives for National Security (BENS) is an American nonpartisan, nonprofit organization. Prominent members include Amazon founder Jeff Bezos, former Cisco chairman John P. Morgridge, and former Infor CEO Charles E. Phillips. The organization's current President is retired U.S. Army General Joseph Votel, the 13th commander of U.S. Central Command, and their current chairman is Mark J. Gerencser, former Managing Partner of Booz Allen Hamilton.

Founded in 1982 by mining executive Stanley A. Weiss, BENS provides a channel through which senior American business leaders volunteer their experience and expertise to help national security agencies become more efficient and effective. BENS has 7 regional offices across the country, with a national office based in Washington, D.C.

BENS’ early work focused extensively on initiatives aimed at U.S.-Soviet threat reduction and inefficiencies within support functions of the Department of Defense, e.g., the maintenance and construction of military housing. The organization was also active in BRAC, championing the process and helping develop transition plans for locations affected by base closure. Over the last decade, the organization expanded their focus, addressing issues such as cybersecurity, domestic counterterrorism, and talent management. They have also broadened their partnerships to include other government agencies such as the Departments of State, Treasury, and Homeland Security; the Office of the Director of National Intelligence; and the unified combatant commands. Work provided by BENS members is pro bono.

References

External links
www.bens.org

Organizations based in Washington, D.C.